Nothofagus beardmorensis was a species of plant, fossils of which have been found in Late Pliocene rocks in the Dominion Range of the Transantarctic Mountains.

References

Nothofagaceae
Pliocene plants